Gosford Hospital is a state owned public hospital in Gosford, New South Wales, Australia.  It is part of the Central Coast Local Health District (CCLHD) which is a division of New South Wales Ministry of Health. Gosford Hospital provides a range of medical, surgical and maternity services to the Central Coast region of New South Wales.

History 
The former hospital in Gosford, Gosford District Hospital, was opened by Hon C.A. Kelly, M.L.A., on 26 May 1945.

There have been progressive upgrades and expansion to the medical, patient, and staff facilities throughout the history of the hospital. This includes the adaption of buildings in and around the hospital to provide additional health services.

Operations
The hospital's emergency department is the third busiest in the state. Patients needing advanced care in specialties not present in Gosford, such as cardio-thoracic or neurosurgery, are transferred to other NSW hospitals including  Royal North Shore Hospital, John Hunter Hospital or Royal Alexandra Hospital for Children.

Gosford Hospital is a multi-level building covering eleven storeys and is a teaching hospital affiliated with the University of Newcastle and the University of New England.  Medical, nursing, and  allied health students are placed there for practical terms.

Speciality Services

See also
List of hospitals in Australia

References

Central Coast (New South Wales)
Hospitals in New South Wales
Hospitals established in 1945
Teaching hospitals in Australia